Rao S. Govindaraju is the Christopher B. and Susan S. Burke Professor of Civil Engineering at Purdue University. His specialty is hydraulic and hydrologic engineering. He is currently the editor-in-chief of American Society of Civil Engineers' Journal of Hydrologic Engineering.

External links
College of Engineering, Purdue University

Living people
Purdue University faculty
Year of birth missing (living people)
University of California, Davis alumni
Place of birth missing (living people)
Hydraulic engineers